Borman is a surname. Notable people with the surname include:

Danleigh Borman (born 1985), South African soccer player
Frank Borman (born 1928), American astronaut
The Frank Borman Expressway in Indiana named after him
Geoffrey D. Borman, American quantitative methodologist and policy analyst 
Moritz Borman, film producer
Paul D. Borman, American federal judge
Terry Borman, American luthier (violin maker)

See also
Borman (crater), a lunar impact crater 
Boreman
Boorman
Bormann